Miss Europe 1988 was the 45th edition of the Miss Europe pageant and the 34th edition under the Mondial Events Organization. It was held in Ragusa, Sicily, Italy on 8 May 1988. Michela Rocco di Torrepadula of Italy, was crowned Miss Europe 1988 by out going titleholder Juncal Rivero Fadrique Castilla of Spain.

Results

Placements

Contestants 

 - UNKNOWN
 - UNKNOWN
 - UNKNOWN
 - Janne Montell
 - Minna Susanna Rinnetmaki
 - Nathalie Marquay
 - Renate Budina
 - Isabella Serra
 - Ariadne Mylona
 - Mascha ten Haaf
 - Magnea Lovisa Magnúsdóttir
 - Limor Magen
 - Michela Rocco di Torrepadula
 - UNKNOWN
 - Hege Arnesen
 - Ewa Monika Nowosadko
 - Helena Isabel da Cunha Laureano
 - Eileen Ann Catterson
 - Ana Jesús Rebollos Fernández
 - Annelie Eriksson
 - Şebnem Tan
 - Nicola Gail Davies
 - UNKNOWN

Notes

Withdrawals

Returns

"Comité Officiel et International Miss Europe" 1987 Competition

The competition took place in Frankfurt, Germany. There were at least 16 delegates all from their own countries. At the end, Sandrina Rossi of France was crowned as Miss Europa 1987. Rossi succeeded her predecessor Raquel Bruhn (Rachel Bruhn) of Sweden.

Placements

Contestants

 - Sandrina Rossi
 - Judith Schimmel
 - Hege Rasmussen

References

External links 
 

Miss Europe
1987 beauty pageants
1988 beauty pageants
1987 in Germany
1988 in Italy
Beauty pageants in Italy
Ragusa, Sicily